Orenburg Governorate was an administrative division (a guberniya) of the Russian Empire with the center in the city of Orenburg, Ufa (1802-1865).

The governorate was created in 1744 from the lands annexed from Siberian and Astrakhan Governorates. In 1796, Ufa Viceroyalty was renamed Orenburg Governorate, and in 1865 it was split in two—a smaller Orenburg Governorate, and Ufa Governorate.

In 1919, Chelyabinsk Governorate was split off from Orenburg Governorate, and in 1928 the governorate was merged into a newly created Middle Volga Oblast.

Administrative division
After the creation of Ufa Governorate in 1865, Orenburg Governorate  consisted of the following uyezds (administrative centres in parentheses):
 Verkhneuralsky Uyezd (Verkhneuralsk)
 Orenburgsky Uyezd (Orenburg)
 Orsky Uyezd (Orsk)
 Troitsky Uyezd (Troitsk)
 Chelyabinsky Uyezd (Chelyabinsk)

Notable people
Nikolay Anisimov (1877–1931), major general of the White Army
Gury Marchuk, (1925–2013) Soviet scientist

References

 
1744 establishments in the Russian Empire
States and territories established in 1744
States and territories disestablished in 1782
States and territories established in 1796
States and territories disestablished in 1928
Orenburg